Richard George Stanhope Gregg (9 December 1883 – 20 May 1945) was an Irish field hockey player born in Portsmouth, England. He played for, amongst others, Three Rock Rovers and Ireland. Together with fellow Rovers players, Henry Murphy and Charles Power, he was a member of the Ireland team that won the silver medal at the 1908 London Olympics. Gregg played in both the 3–1 win against Wales on 29 October and in the 8–1 defeat against England in the final on 31 October.
. The Ireland team was part of the Great Britain Olympic team.

References

External links
 

1883 births
1945 deaths
Sportspeople from Portsmouth
Members of the Ireland hockey team at the 1908 Summer Olympics
Irish male field hockey players
Medalists at the 1908 Summer Olympics
Olympic silver medallists for Great Britain
Three Rock Rovers Hockey Club players
Ireland international men's field hockey players
Dublin University Hockey Club players